The 2012 Stanford Cardinal football team represented Stanford University in the 2012 NCAA Division I FBS football season. The Cardinal were led by second-year head coach David Shaw.  They played their home games at Stanford Stadium and were members of the North Division of the Pac-12 Conference.

The Cardinal won their first Pac-12 championship since 1999 after defeating UCLA in the Pac-12 Football Championship Game. They represented the Pac-12 in the Rose Bowl, where they defeated Wisconsin to win their first Rose Bowl championship since 1972. This was Stanford's third consecutive year playing in a BCS bowl game. They finished the season with a 12–2 record (8–1 Pac-12).

Schedule

Roster

Coaching staff
David Shaw–Head Coach (Bradford M. Freeman Director of Football)
Derek Mason–Associate Head Coach/Defensive Coordinator
Pep Hamilton–Offensive Coordinator/Quarterbacks (Andrew Luck Director of Offense)
David Kotulski–Inside Linebackers
Randy Hart–Assistant Coach – Defensive Line
Mike Bloomgren–Running Game Coordinator/Offensive Line
Mike Sanford Jr.–Assistant Coach – Running Backs/Recruiting Coord.
Lance Anderson–Assistant Coach-Outside Linebackers/Admissions Liaison
Pete Alamar –Special Teams Coordinator
Ron Crook –Tight Ends/Offensive Tackles
Shannon Turley –Head Strength Coach
Nick Holz –Offensive Assistant
Aaron Moorehead –Offensive Assistant
Morgan Turner –Offensive Assistant
Tavita Pritchard –Defensive Assistant

Game summaries

San Jose State

    
    
    
    
    
    
    

Known as the "Bill Walsh Legacy Game" (Bill Walsh was a graduate of San Jose State and a two-time head coach at Stanford), this game marked the 66th meeting between Stanford and San Jose State—the most times Stanford has faced a single non-Pac-12 opponent. In their first game after the Andrew Luck era, the Cardinal struggled offensively, but persevered over the Spartans, taking a 20–17 victory. Luck's successor at quarterback, Josh Nunes, threw one touchdown pass and running back Stepfan Taylor rushed for 116 yards and scored Stanford's other touchdown in the first quarter. The Spartans added two third-quarter touchdowns—a Blake Jurich run and a David Fales to Noel Grigsby completion—to tie the score. A fourth-quarter field goal from Jordan Williamson put the Cardinal in front to stay.

Duke

    
    
    
    
    
    
    
    
    
    
    
    

Drew Terrell returned a punt 76 yards for a touchdown and caught a Josh Nunes pass for another as Stanford routed Duke, 50–13. Nunes completed 16 of 30 passes for 275 yards and 3 touchdowns. Meanwhile, the Cardinal defense stifled the Blue Devils, holding them to just 27 rushing yards. Stanford defensive back Ed Reynolds intercepted Duke quarterback Sean Renfree twice, returning one 71 yards for another touchdown.

USC

    
    
    
    
    

Stanford's defense held USC to just 26 rushing yards and sacked Matt Barkley 5 times as the Cardinal came from behind to upset the second-ranked Trojans, 21–14. Stanford won its fourth in a row against USC, its longest winning streak in the rivalry that dates to 1905. Stanford's Stepfan Taylor rushed for 153 yards and a touchdown and caught a touchdown pass from Josh Nunes that tied the game in the third quarter. Nunes later connected on a fourth-quarter strike to tight end Zach Ertz to put the Cardinal ahead to stay. Barkley, who likely finished his college career winless against Stanford, threw two interceptions as USC failed to score in the second half. Stepfan Taylor was named the Pac-12 Offensive Player of the Week for his efforts, and Stanford defensive end Ben Gardner, who recorded six tackles (3.5 tackles for losses) and a sack, was the conference Defensive Player of the Week.

Washington

    
    
    
    
    
    

Stanford failed to score an offensive touchdown for the first time since 2007 as the Huskies beat the Cardinal 17–13. The Husky defense held the Cardinal to just 235 yards of total offense. Stanford's defense was stingy in the first half, and gave the Cardinal its only touchdown of the day when linebacker Trent Murphy tipped and returned a Keith Price pass 40 yards for the score. But the Huskies broke through on the last play of the third quarter, when Bishop Sankey broke free on a fourth down play for a 61-yard touchdown run. Price connected with Kasen Williams for a touchdown pass late in the fourth quarter to seal the game for the Huskies.

Arizona

    
    
    
    
    
    
    
    
    
    
    
    
    
    
    
    

Coming off a lackluster performance the previous week in which Stanford failed to score an offensive touchdown, Stanford's Josh Nunes threw for 360 yards and two touchdowns and rushed for three more as the Cardinal came back from a 14 point fourth quarter deficit to beat the Wildcats in overtime, 54–48. For the Wildcats, Ka'Deem Carey ran for three touchdowns and quarterback Matt Scott completed 45 of 69 passes (school records for attempts and completions), including three touchdown passes. However, on the first possession in overtime, Scott's pass was intercepted by Chase Thomas, setting up a 21-yard Stepfan Taylor touchdown run to win the game.

at Notre Dame

In a defensive struggle with a controversial ending, Stanford fell to Notre Dame in overtime, 20–13. For the second time in three weeks, the Cardinal failed to score an offensive touchdown, with its lone touchdown coming as Chase Thomas recovered an Everett Golson fumble in the end zone. Stanford's defense later knocked Golson out of the game and replaced him with Tommy Rees. Notre Dame would tie the score on a Kyle Brindza field goal with 20 seconds left in regulation to send the game to overtime. Notre Dame got the ball first and Rees connected with TJ Jones on a 7-yard touchdown pass. Stanford quickly moved the ball to first-and-goal from the four, and after three Notre Dame stops, had the ball inside the one on fourth down. On the game's final play, Stepfan Taylor dove for the end zone, but his initial rush was stopped. Although he eventually reached the end zone, officials ruled that his forward progress had been stopped. An official review did not overturn the decision and Notre Dame took back the Legends Trophy.

California

    
    
    
    

The Cardinal defense held the Bears to 3 yards rushing on the way to a 21–3 victory, their third straight Big Game win. Quarterback Josh Nunes threw for 214 yards and a touchdown. Backup quarterback Kevin Hogan threw and completed his first career pass for the Cardinal, a touchdown to Levine Toilolo. Stanford running back Stepfan Taylor rushed for 189 yards (a career-high) and a touchdown. He moved past Toby Gerhart for second place overall among Stanford's career rushing list. Taylor's 3,616 yards trails only Darrin Nelson.

This marked the first time that the Big Game was played in October. The game was moved due to scheduling issues created with the expansion of the conference and the television programming requirements of the Pac-12 Network.

Washington State

    
    
    
    
    
    
    

Washington State, winless in Pac-12 play, kept Stanford close, but the Cardinal prevailed, 24–17. The Cardinal offense sputtered all day, with just 12 first downs on the day and converting only 5 of 12 third downs. Stepfan Taylor managed only 58 yards on 21 carries and no scores, while quarterback Josh Nunes completed just 7 of 15 passes and a lone touchdown pass to Jamal-Rashad Patterson. For Washington State, quarterback Jeff Tuel threw for 401 yards and two touchdown passes, but was sacked by the Cardinal defense 10 times, leading to an overall rushing yardage loss of 16 yards. Tuel also threw a fourth quarter interception that was returned for a touchdown by Stanford safety Ed Reynolds, which provided the final winning margin.

Colorado

    
    
    
    
    
    
    
    

Stanford head coach David Shaw turned over his offense to quarterback Kevin Hogan late in the first quarter as Stanford gave Colorado its first shutout at home in 26 years, 48–0. Whereas in previous weeks, quarterback Josh Nunes had looked ineffective, Hogan was extremely effective, running for 48 yards and throwing for 184 more and two touchdowns. Stepfan Taylor added two touchdown runs, and Ed Reynolds returned an interception for a touchdown, his third of the season.

Oregon State

    
    
    
    
    
    
    
    
    

In his first start as quarterback, Kevin Hogan connected for two late touchdown passes to lead the Cardinal to a comeback victory over the Beavers, 27–23. Stanford had taken an early lead on a Stepfan Taylor run and a Hogan pass to Ryan Hewitt, but the Beavers took momentum into halftime on a Terron Ward run and a short field goal, and continued to control the game in the third quarter, taking the lead on a Cody Vaz touchdown pass to Markus Wheaton and padding it with two more Trevor Romaine field goals. But on the last play of the third quarter, Stanford's Taylor caught a short pass from Hogan and took it 40 yards to bring the Cardinal within 2 points. After Hogan's third touchdown pass of the day to Zach Ertz gave the Cardinal back the lead, quarterback Vaz fumbled on Oregon State's next possession and Stanford ran out most of the clock to secure the victory.

Oregon

    
    
    
    
    

In an overtime thriller, Stanford upset #1-ranked Oregon 17–14, all but ending the Ducks' hopes for a return to the BCS National Championship Game and putting the Cardinal in the driver's seat for the Pac-12 Championship Game and the Rose Bowl. Stanford's defense limited Oregon's rushing attack, then ranked third in the nation, to just 198 rushing yards, and held its leading rusher, Kenjon Barner, to just 66 yards. Oregon led 14–7 with less than two minutes to go before Kevin Hogan found Zach Ertz in the end zone for a touchdown catch that was initially ruled incomplete; further official review overturned the call, saying that Ertz controlled the ball before rolling out of bounds. In the first possession of overtime, Ducks kicker Alejandro Maldonado missed a 41-yard field goal. In Stanford's possession, kicker Jordan Williamson, who had been inconsistent most of the year and who had missed a game-winning attempt in the 2012 Fiesta Bowl, kicked a 37-yard field goal to give the Cardinal the win.

UCLA

    
    
    
    
    
    
    
    

Stanford defeated UCLA 35–17 to clinch the Pac-12 North Division title, setting up a rematch with UCLA in the 2012 Pac-12 Football Championship Game. Stepfan Taylor rushed for two touchdowns, Anthony Wilkerson rushed for another, and Kevin Hogan threw a touchdown pass to Drew Terrell in a balanced offensive performance. Usua Amanam recovered a fumble following a kickoff and returned it for the final Stanford touchdown.

UCLA (Pac-12 Championship Game)

    
    
    
    
    
    
    
    
    

The Cardinal earned its first Rose Bowl appearance in 13 years with a comeback 27–24 victory over the Bruins, whom they had met just six days earlier in their final regular season game. The Cardinal's rushing defense, ranked among the nation's best, gave up the most yards it had all season as the Bruins rushed for 284 yards, 194 of which came from Johnathan Franklin, who also scored two touchdowns. Stanford quarterback Kevin Hogan threw for 155 yards and a fourth-quarter touchdown to tie the score. Hogan also ran for Stanford's first touchdown. Stanford kicker Jordan Williamson had two field goals, including the game winner with less than 7 minutes remaining in the game. UCLA kicker Ka'imi Fairbairn missed a 52-yard field goal that would have tied the game with 39 seconds left to send Stanford to its third straight BCS bowl appearance.

Wisconsin (Rose Bowl)

  
    
    
    
    
    

Stanford won its first Rose Bowl in 41 years, winning 20–14 over Wisconsin, which lost its third Rose Bowl in as many years. The Cardinal appeared poised to run away with the game, scoring quickly on its first possession following a trick play where wide receiver Drew Terrell threw a 34-yard pass to Jamal-Rashad Patterson. Stepfan Taylor added a three-yard run on Stanford's next possession. Stanford held Wisconsin out of the end zone on fourth and goal from the one yard line but after punting from their own end zone, were unable to stop the Badgers' Montee Ball on an 11-yard touchdown run. Stanford's Jordan Williamson added a long field goal, and then Wisconsin scored just before halftime to close within three points. In the third quarter, teams exchanged punts as both defenses held firm and allowed no scoring. In the fourth quarter, Stanford drove inside the Wisconsin 10, but the Badgers forced a field goal keeping the game within a single score. But Stanford's Usua Amanam intercepted Curt Phillips on the next series, icing the game for the Cardinal.

Rankings

Statistics

Scores by quarter (all opponents)

Scores by quarter (Pac-12 opponents)

References

Stanford
Stanford Cardinal football seasons
Pac-12 Conference football champion seasons
Rose Bowl champion seasons
Stanford Cardinal football